William W. Eldridge IV is an American General District Court Judge for the 26th Judicial District of Virginia.

Early life and education
Eldridge was raised in Orange County, California. He attended George Mason University School of Law, graduating in 2004 with a juris doctor. He passed the bar in 2004.

Career
Eldridge was a partner at Eldridge & Nagy until 2015, working as a defense attorney. Eldridge worked on one federal and one state death penalty case. He also represented clients in civil litigation.

In June 2015, Eldridge was temporarily appointed to the 26th Judicial Circuit of Virginia and was sworn in on July 8, 2015. He was later assigned to the Harrisonburg and Rockingham County General District Court. On May 1, 2020, his began an eight-year term.

Personal life
Eldridge lives in Harrisonburg, Virginia.

References

Living people
Year of birth missing (living people)
Virginia lawyers
Antonin Scalia Law School alumni
20th-century American lawyers
21st-century American judges